This page is a directory to various pages that will list political parties, from around the world, according to their respective regions. All of the pages linked from here include a table listing the sub-pages of countries/jurisdiction in the given region, showing which party system is dominant in each country.

A political party is a political organization subscribing to a certain ideology or formed around very special issues with the aim to participate in power, usually by participating in elections.  Individual parties are properly listed in separate articles under the page for each nation.



List by regions and sub-regions

Africa

List of political parties in Africa by country
List of political parties in Eastern Africa by country
List of political parties in Middle Africa by country
List of political parties in Northern Africa by country
List of political parties in Southern Africa by country
List of political parties in Western Africa by country

Americas

List of political parties in the Caribbean by country
List of political parties in Central America by country
List of political parties in North America by country
List of political parties in South America by country

Asia

List of political parties in Central Asia by country
List of political parties in Eastern Asia by country
List of political parties in Southern Asia by country
List of political parties in Southeast Asia by country
List of political parties in Western Asia by country

Europe

List of political parties in Eastern Europe
List of political parties in Northern Europe
List of political parties in Southern Europe
List of political parties in Western Europe

Oceania

List of political parties in Australia
List of political parties in Melanesia by country
List of political parties in Micronesia by country
List of political parties in New Zealand
List of political parties in Polynesia by country

See also
 List of basic political science topics
 List of democracy and elections-related topics
 List of frivolous parties
 List of election results
 List of national leaders

External links 
 Political resources on the net
 Leftist Parties of the World - Detailed resource for left-leaning parties (large and small) in each country

 
Region
Political parties by region